The Faculty of Philosophy, Languages and Human Sciences (Portuguese: Faculdade de Filosofia, Letras e Ciências Humanas, FFLCH) is a unit of the University of São Paulo, Brazil. It offers undergraduate and graduate courses in philosophy, social sciences, history, geography, literature, languages and linguistics. It was founded in 1934 as the Faculty of Philosophy, Sciences and Languages (Faculdade de Filosofia, Ciências e Letras, FFCL).

Organization 
The faculty currently offers five main undergraduate courses ― history, geography, social sciences, philosophy and languages/literature (letras) ― which are organized under eleven departments:

 Anthropology
 Political Science
 Sociology
 Philosophy
 Geography
 History
 Classical and Vernacular Languages and Literatures
 Modern Languages and Literatures
 Eastern Languages and Literatures
 Linguistics
 Literary Theory and Comparative Literature

Emeriti professors 
The title of emeritus professor (professor emérito) has been bestowed on the following professors:

 1964 - Fernando de Azevedo
 1965 - Milton Camargo da Silva Rodrigues
 1966 - Mário Pereira de Souza Lima
 1966 - Ernest Gustav Gotthelf Marcus
 1966 - Antonio Candido de Mello e Souza
 1981 - José Ribeiro de Araújo Filho
 1982 - Antonio Augusto Soares Amora
 1985 - Isaac Nicolau Salum
 1985 - Florestan Fernandes
 1987 - Azis Simão
 1987 - Segismundo Spina
 1989 - Egon Schaden
 1990 - Maira Isaura Pereira de Queiroz
 1992 - Fernando Henrique Cardoso
 1993 - Donald Pierson
 1994 - Oracy Nogueira
 1994 - Eduardo d'Oliveira França 
 1997 - Milton Santos
 1997 - Pasquale Petrone
 1997 - Octavio Ianni
 1998 - José Arthur Gianotti
 1998 - Ruy Fausto
 1998 - Bento Prado de Almeida Ferraz Junior
 1998 - Leyla Perrone-Moisés
 1999 - Gilda de Mello e Souza
 1999 - Emilia Viotti da Costa
 2000 - Aziz Nacib Ab'Saber
 2001 - João Baptista Borges Pereira
 2001 - José Aderaldo Castello
 2001 - Oswaldo Porchat de Assis Pereira da Silva
 2001 - Boris Schnaiderman
 2001 - Décio de Almeida Prado - posthumous
 2002 - Eunice Ribeiro Durham
 2003 - Paula Beiguelman
 2003 - Carlos Augusto de Figueiredo Monteiro
 2003 - José Pereira de Queiroz Neto
 2003 - José Sebastião Witter
 2006 - Fernando Antonio Novais
 2008 - Ulpiano Toledo Bezerra de Meneses
 2008 - Francisco Maria Cavalcanti de Oliveira
 2008 - José de Souza Martins
 2009 - Alfredo Bosi
 2009 - Marlyse Madeleine Meyer
 2009 - Carlos Guilherme Santos Serôa da Mota
 2010 - Dino Fioravante Preti
 2010 - Lux Boelitz Vidal
 2010 - Sedi Hirano
 2011 - Walnice Nogueira Galvão
 2011 - Davi Arrigucci Júnior
 2011 - Gabriel Cohn
 2012 - Maria Lígia Coelho Prado
 2013 - Ataliba Teixeira de Castilho
 2013 - Maria Odila Leite da Silva Dias
 2013 - Francisco Corrêa Weffort
 2014 - Maria de Lourdes Monaco Janotti
 2015 - Anita Waingort Novinsky
 2017 - Marilena Chauí

References 

University of São Paulo
1934 establishments in Brazil
Educational institutions established in 1934